Genuine is Japanese singer songwriter Fayray's third studio album and last under the Antinos Records label. The album was released on July 18, 2001.

Track listing

Charts and sales

References

External links

2001 albums
Fayray albums